Başören may refer to:

 Başören, Bismil
 Başören, Ceyhan, Adana Province, Turkey
 Başören, Şuhut, Afyonkarahisar Province, Turkey
 Başören, Beypazarı, Ankara Province, Turkey
 Başören, Kızılcahamam, Ankara Province, Turkey
 Başören, Kastamonu, Kastamonu Province, Turkey
 Başören, Pasinler